Janq'u Qalani (Aymara janq'u white, qala stone, -ni a suffix, "the one with the white stone", also spelled Jankho Khalani) is a  mountain in the Bolivian Andes. It is located in the Cochabamba Department, Tapacari Province. Janq'u Qalani lies northeast of Q'ara Willk'i and Lluxita.

References 

Mountains of Cochabamba Department